Victor Isidores dze Dolidze (ვიქტორ ისიდორეს ძე დოლიძე, 30 July 1890 – 24 May 1933) was a Georgian classical composer. 

Practically unknown in the West, in his home country Dolidze is best remembered for his opera Keto and Kote, which premiered in 1919 during the First Republic. The composition, which remains popular to this day, follows the story of forbidden love between an impoverished prince and a wealthy commoner's daughter.

Biography

Victor Dolidze was born on 30 July 1890  in the city of Ozurgeti, Kutais Governorate, in what is now Georgia, then part of the Russian Empire. He came from a poor peasant family.

In 1902, Dolidze's family moved to  Tiflis, where entered a commercial school. In 1910, he won his first prize at a local mandolin contest.

After his high-school graduation in Georgia, he attended the Kiev Commercial Institute, and concurrently began to work in a music school for violin and composition. In 1917 he graduated from college and returned to Georgia and dedicated himself to music full time.

Victor Dolidze is the author of several operas, including the first Georgian opera buffa Keto and Kote, with his own libretto based on the comedy Khanuma by Avksenty Tsagareli.

Following the forced absorption of Georgia into the Soviet Union, some of Dolidze's later compositions faced scrutiny from Soviet censors. For example, Dolidze's lesser known opera, "Leila", was removed from repertory because one of its main characters was a Georgian monarch, which the Soviet authorities feared would encourage "monarchist sentiments".

Victor Dolidze died on 24 May 1933 in Tiflis and is buried at the Didube Pantheon.

See also
Heraclius Djabadary
Zacharia Paliashvili
Dimitri Arakishvili

References

1890 births
1933 deaths
20th-century classical composers
20th-century male musicians
Burials at Didube Pantheon
Classical composers from Georgia (country)
Male classical composers
Male opera composers
Opera composers from Georgia (country)
People from Kutais Governorate
People from Ozurgeti